Amos Lewis Quick III (born August 14, 1968) is an American politician. He was elected to the North Carolina House of Representatives in 2016. A Democrat, he has represented the 58th district (including constituents in Guilford County) since 2017.

Electoral history

2020

2018

2016

Committee assignments

2021-2022 session
Appropriations
Appropriations - Agriculture and Natural and Economic Resources
Environment
Pensions and Retirement
Rules, Calendar, and Operations of the House
State Government

2019-2020 session
Appropriations
Appropriations - Agriculture and Natural and Economic Resources
Environment
Pensions and Retirement
Rules, Calendar, and Operations of the House
State and Local Government

2017-2018 session
Appropriations
Appropriations - Capital
Commerce and Job Development
Education - K-12
Homelessness, Foster Care, and Dependency
Judiciary III

References

External links

Living people
1968 births
People from Greensboro, North Carolina
Democratic Party members of the North Carolina House of Representatives
21st-century American politicians
21st-century African-American politicians